South Guard is a remote  mountain summit located near the northern end of the Great Western Divide of the Sierra Nevada mountain range, in Tulare County of northern California. South Guard ranks as the 103rd highest summit in California, and the third-highest point of the northern Great Western Divide.

History
The names South Guard and North Guard first appeared on either side of Mt. Brewer on Lieutenant Milton F. Davis’ map of 1896. The first ascent of South Guard's lower 12,964-ft peak was made July 26, 1916, by Walter L. Huber, James Rennie, Florence C. Burrell, and Inezetta Holt. The main 13,232-ft summit was first climbed July 17, 1925, by Norman Clyde, who is credited with 130 first ascents, most of which were in the Sierra Nevada. A possibility exists that this peak may have been climbed by Clarence King and Richard D. Cotter on July 4, 1864.

Climate
South Guard is located in an alpine climate zone. Most weather fronts originate in the Pacific Ocean, and travel east toward the Sierra Nevada mountains. As fronts approach, they are forced upward by the peaks, causing them to drop their moisture in the form of rain or snowfall onto the range (orographic lift). Precipitation runoff from the east side of the mountain drains to Bubbs Creek, and west to Roaring River, which are both tributaries of the South Fork Kings River.

See also

 List of mountain peaks of California

References

External links
 Weather forecast: South Guard

Mountains of Tulare County, California
Mountains of Kings Canyon National Park
North American 4000 m summits
Mountains of Northern California
Sierra Nevada (United States)